The Skeleton Canyon treasure is said to be located in the Peloncillo Mountains within Skeleton Canyon. The canyon straddles the modern Arizona and New Mexico state line border and connects the Animas Valley of New Mexico, (the New Mexico Bootheel region), with the San Simon Valley of Arizona. An alleged treasure tale, involving a Mexican gang in a sack of Monterrey, Mexico and buried in southeastern Arizona's Skeleton Canyon in the summer and fall of 1881.

According to extant stories, a Mexican gang led by Jose Estrada had sacked several banks and cathedrals in Monterrey, taking a large amount of gold and silver bullion, gold statuary, and diamonds. Some stories indicate the items taken include 39 gold bars and a cigarbox full of diamonds.  This gang then made their way northwest, towards Arizona, where they were ambushed by American outlaws in the Peloncillo Mountains as they made their way through Skeleton Canyon towards the Animas Valley of New Mexico.  Having killed off the Mexican outlaws, the American outlaws supposedly buried the treasure there, and made their way out of the canyon, only to die off one by one in a series of later double-crosses.  The treasure remains unrecovered.

In treasure hunting there are always true stories, false ones, and those built up from minor events.  Skeleton Canyon is of the latter.  Between the late 1870s  and early 1880s the Clanton Gang operated in that part of Arizona.  Their modus operandi was to rustle cattle and sell the stock to the mining towns which sprang up during that time.  Their victims included Mexicans, some of whom were involved in legitimate cattle drives, as well as those engaged in the illegal smuggling of various goods.  The canyons along the western side of the Pelloncillos were favored as ambush sites, and it is documented that at least four such ambush/robberies took place.  On 13 August 1881, in retaliation for one such ambush, Neuman Haynes Clanton was gunned down in the Guadalupe Canyon Massacre.

The ambush and robberies in those canyons may have netted the outlaws a small fortune, possibly a few thousand dollars at most, which then grew into the Skeleton Canyon tales today.  The large amount that is stated in the tales never existed; a check of newspapers and government sources within Mexico and the U.S. states bordering the area revealed that the source of the treasure, Monterrey, was never sacked and robbed at any time.

The legend was dramatized on a 1990 episode of Unsolved Mysteries.

References

American frontier
Arizona folklore
New Mexico Bootheel
New Mexico folklore
Treasure in Arizona
Treasure of the United States